In geometry, a uniform polyhedron compound is a polyhedral compound whose constituents are identical (although possibly enantiomorphous) uniform polyhedra, in an arrangement that is also uniform, i.e. the symmetry group of the compound acts transitively on the compound's vertices.

The uniform polyhedron compounds were first enumerated by John Skilling in 1976, with a proof that the enumeration is complete. The following table lists them according to his numbering.

Furthermore, when , the antiprisms degenerate into tetrahedra with digonal bases.

References 
.

External links 
 http://www.interocitors.com/polyhedra/UCs/ShortNames.html - Bowers style acronyms for uniform polyhedron compounds

Polyhedral compounds